The Terai–Duar savanna and grasslands is a narrow lowland ecoregion at the base of the Himalayas, about  wide, and a continuation of the Indo-Gangetic Plain in India, Nepal and Bhutan. It is colloquially called Terai in the Ganges Basin east to Nepal, then Dooars in West Bengal, Bhutan and Assam east to the Brahmaputra River. It harbours the world's tallest grasslands, which are the most threatened and rare worldwide.

Location and description
This tropical and subtropical grasslands, savannas, and shrublands biome stretches from western Bhutan to southern Nepal's Terai, westward to Banke, covering the Dang and Deukhuri Valleys along the Rapti River to India's Bhabar and Doon Valley. Each end crosses the border into India's states of Uttarakhand, Uttar Pradesh and Bihar. The eastern and central areas are wetter than the western end.

In Nepal, the wetlands of Koshi Tappu Wildlife Reserve, Beeshazar Tal in the bufferzone of Chitwan National Park, Jagdishpur Reservoir and Ghodaghodi Tal are designated Ramsar sites. The Sukla Phanta Wildlife Reserve is Nepal's largest patch of continuous grassland.

Flora
The Terai–Duar savanna and grasslands are a mosaic of tall riverside grasslands, savannas and evergreen and deciduous forests, depending on soil quality and the amount of rain each area receives. The grasslands of the Terai in Nepal are among the tallest in the world, and are maintained by silt deposited by the yearly monsoon floods. Important grasses include baruwa (Tripidium bengalense) and kans grass (Saccharum spontaneum), which quickly establishes itself after the retreat of the monsoon waters. The belt also contains riverside tropical deciduous forest comprising Mallotus philippensis, jamun, cotton tree, Mallotus nudiflorus, and Garuga pinnata.

Fauna
The ecoregion is habitat for a huge number of mammalian and bird species. Notable are the large numbers of the endangered greater one-horned rhinoceros and Bengal tigers as well as Asian elephants, sloth bears, Indian leopards.

Nepal's Bardia National Park and Sukla Phanta Wildlife Reserve, and India's Valmiki and Dudhwa National Parks are home to nearly 100 tigers. Chitwan along with the adjoining Parsa National Park is of major importance, especially for tigers and clouded leopard. Grazing animals of the grasslands include five species of deer, barasingha, sambar, chital, hog deer and muntjac along with four large grazing animals, Asian elephant, rhinoceros, gaur and nilgai. Endangered mammals found here include the wild water buffalo and the near-endemic hispid hare (Caprolagus hispidus).

The grasslands are also home to a number of reptiles including the gharial, mugger crocodile and soft-shelled turtles.

The grasslands partly cover two BirdLife International Endemic Bird Areas, the Central Himalayas EBA in western Nepal and the western end of the Assam Plains EBA south of Bhutan. There are three near-endemic bird species including the vulnerable Manipur bush quail (Perdicula manipurensis). The 44 threatened and declining bird species of the grasslands include the Bengal florican (Houbaropsis bengalensis), lesser florican (Sypheotides indica), sarus crane (Grus antigone) and rufous-rumped grassbird (Graminicola bengalensis).

Threats and conservation
Although the population density has been low it is now growing, especially in the Terai belt. Much of the ecoregion has been converted to farmland since the forest was cut down for timber. Shuklaphanta National Park, Chitwan, Bardia and Dudhwa National Parks, Some protected areas preserve significant sections of habitat, and are home to some of the greatest concentrations of Indian rhinoceros and Bengal tiger remaining in South Asia. The areas with tall grasslands are of special conservation importance. The remaining forest is mostly in the drier bhabar belt, with some forest patches in Chitwan National Park.

See also
List of ecoregions in India

References

External links 
WWF: Map of ecoregions in Nepal, showing the Terai-Duar savanna and grasslands
The Ramsar Convention on Wetlands: The Annotated Ramsar List of Nepal

 
Tropical and subtropical grasslands, savannas, and shrublands
Ecoregions of the Himalayas
Grasslands of Bhutan
Grasslands of India
Grasslands of Nepal
Ecoregions of India
Ecoregions of Nepal
Ecoregions of Bhutan
.
Geography of Uttarakhand
Ecoregions of Asia
Indomalayan ecoregions